The Mexican Lucha libre, or professional wrestling promotion International Wrestling Revolution Group (IWRG) has produced and scripted a number of wrestling shows since their creation on January 1, 1996 by promoter Adolfo "Pirata" Moreno. In 2019, IWRG held a total of 50 shows, an average of 0.96, just under one show shows per week, all in Arena Naucalpan. On thirteen occasions the main event of the show was a championship match and on six occasions the main event was a Lucha de Apuestas, or "bet match".

2019 events

Footnotes

See also
 2019 in professional wrestling

References

External links

 

2019 in professional wrestling
professional wrestling
International Wrestling Revolution Group shows